The 2016 Southern Conference women's soccer tournament is the postseason women's soccer tournament for the Southern Conference to be held from October 26 to November 6, 2016. The nine match tournament will be held at campus sites, with the semifinals and final held at Taylor Stadium in Johnson City, Tennessee. The ten team single-elimination tournament will consist of three rounds based on seeding from regular season conference play. The Furman Paladins are the defending tournament champions after defeating the Mercer Bears in the championship match.

Bracket

Schedule

First round

Quarterfinals

Semifinals

Final

References

External links 

 
Southern Conference Women's Soccer Tournament